Ambika Temple, also known as Ambaji Temple, is a temple dedicated to goddess Ambika on Girnar hill in Junagadh, Gujarat, India. The present temple was built in 15th century.

History 

The early temple was built before 784 CE (probably in middle of 8th century). An inscription dated Vikram Samvat 1249 (1192 CE) mentions minister Vastupala's pilgrimage to Ambika temple on Raivataka (Girnar) hill. Narendraprabhsuri mentions that Vastupala had installed idols of himself and his brother Tejapala in the temple. Jinharshasuri mentions that Vastupala and his brother Tejapala visited as well as built the large mandapa of the temple and parikara of Ambika. A praśasti eulogy given at the end in a golden lettered copy of Kalpasutra dated Vikram Samvat 1524 (1468 CE) mentions that a Shreshthi (merchant) named Samal Sah restored and renovated the Ambika temple on Girnar. As mentioned in Jain pilgrimage travelogues, the temple had Ambika as a Jain yakshika deity. The Girnar patta from Samvat 1507 in Ranakpur Jain temple also depicts Ambika in similar manner. The temple is built according to Jain tradition and mandapa ceiling match with Girnar Jain temples. According to M. A. Dhaky, the temple came under control of the Brahminical tradition in late medieval period. The original idol was lost during subsequent attacks and currently a falahi is venerated in the temple.

The present temple is built around 15th century. So the temple construction, renovation and reconstruction history extends from mid-8th century to 15th century.

Architecture 

The present temple is built in traditional Indian temple architecture of late 15th century.

Pilgrimage
The temple is much resorted to by newly married couples. The bride and bridegroom have their clothes tied together, and attended by their male and female relations, adore the goddess and present coconuts and other offerings. This pilgrimage is supposed to procure for the couple along continuance of wedded bliss.

The temple is visited by Hindu as well as Jain pilgrims.

See also
 Girnar ropeway

References

Hindu temples in Gujarat
Shakti temples
Tourist attractions in Junagadh district